The 2006 AFF Futsal Championship was the fourth edition of the tournament.  It took place from 2 May to 7 May 2006 in Bangkok, Thailand.

Group stage 
All times are Indochina Time (ICT) – UTC+07:00

Group A

Group B

Knockout stage 
All times are Indochina Time (ICT) – UTC+07:00

Bracket

Semi-finals

Third place play-off

Final

Champions

References 
"AFF Futsal Championship 2006". AseanFootball.org. ASEAN Football Federation. Retrieved 2011-03-06.
De Bock, Christofhe. "ASEAN Futsal Championship 2006". RSSSF. Retrieved 2011-03-06.

External links
 Old website (Archived)
 Official website

AFF Futsal Championship
2006
2006  in Asian futsal
Fut